Antimony (51Sb) occurs in two stable isotopes, 121Sb and 123Sb. There are 35 artificial radioactive isotopes, the longest-lived of which are 125Sb, with a half-life of 2.75856 years; 124Sb, with a half-life of 60.2 days; and 126Sb, with a half-life of 12.35 days. All other isotopes have half-lives less than 4 days, most less than an hour.

There are also many isomers, the longest-lived of which is 120m1Sb with a half-life of 5.76 days.

List of isotopes 

|-
| 103Sb
| style="text-align:right" | 51
| style="text-align:right" | 52
| 102.93969(32)#
| 100# ms [>1.5 µs]
| β+
| 103Sn
| 5/2+#
|
|
|-
| rowspan=4|104Sb
| rowspan=4 style="text-align:right" | 51
| rowspan=4 style="text-align:right" | 53
| rowspan=4|103.93647(39)#
| rowspan=4|0.47(13) s[0.44(+15−11) s]
| β+ (86%)
| 104Sn
| rowspan=4|
| rowspan=4|
| rowspan=4|
|-
| p (7%)
| 103Sn
|-
| β+, p (7%)
| 103In
|-
| α (<1%)
| 100In
|-
| rowspan=3|105Sb
| rowspan=3 style="text-align:right" | 51
| rowspan=3 style="text-align:right" | 54
| rowspan=3|104.93149(11)
| rowspan=3|1.12(16) s
| β+ (99%)
| 105Sn
| rowspan=3|(5/2+)
| rowspan=3|
| rowspan=3|
|-
| p (1%)
| 104Sn
|-
| β+, p (<1%)
| 104In
|-
| 106Sb
| style="text-align:right" | 51
| style="text-align:right" | 55
| 105.92879(34)#
| 0.6(2) s
| β+
| 106Sn
| (4+)
|
|
|-
| style="text-indent:1em" | 106mSb
| colspan="3" style="text-indent:2em" | 1000(500)# keV
| 220(20) ns
|
|
|
|
|
|-
| 107Sb
| style="text-align:right" | 51
| style="text-align:right" | 56
| 106.92415(32)#
| 4.0(2) s
| β+
| 107Sn
| 5/2+#
|
|
|-
| rowspan=2|108Sb
| rowspan=2 style="text-align:right" | 51
| rowspan=2 style="text-align:right" | 57
| rowspan=2|107.92216(22)#
| rowspan=2|7.4(3) s
| β+
| 108Sn
| rowspan=2|(4+)
| rowspan=2|
| rowspan=2|
|-
| β+, p (rare)
| 107In
|-
| 109Sb
| style="text-align:right" | 51
| style="text-align:right" | 58
| 108.918132(20)
| 17.3(5) s
| β+
| 109Sn
| 5/2+#
|
|
|-
| 110Sb
| style="text-align:right" | 51
| style="text-align:right" | 59
| 109.91675(22)#
| 23.0(4) s
| β+
| 110Sn
| (4+)
|
|
|-
| 111Sb
| style="text-align:right" | 51
| style="text-align:right" | 60
| 110.91316(3)
| 75(1) s
| β+
| 111Sn
| (5/2+)
|
|
|-
| 112Sb
| style="text-align:right" | 51
| style="text-align:right" | 61
| 111.912398(19)
| 51.4(10) s
| β+
| 112Sn
| 3+
|
|
|-
| 113Sb
| style="text-align:right" | 51
| style="text-align:right" | 62
| 112.909372(19)
| 6.67(7) min
| β+
| 113Sn
| 5/2+
|
|
|-
| 114Sb
| style="text-align:right" | 51
| style="text-align:right" | 63
| 113.90927(3)
| 3.49(3) min
| β+
| 114Sn
| (3+)
|
|
|-
| style="text-indent:1em" | 114mSb
| colspan="3" style="text-indent:2em" | 495.5(7) keV
| 219(12) µs
|
|
| (8−)
|
|
|-
| 115Sb
| style="text-align:right" | 51
| style="text-align:right" | 64
| 114.906598(17)
| 32.1(3) min
| β+
| 115Sn
| 5/2+
|
|
|-
| 116Sb
| style="text-align:right" | 51
| style="text-align:right" | 65
| 115.906794(6)
| 15.8(8) min
| β+
| 116Sn
| 3+
|
|
|-
| style="text-indent:1em" | 116m1Sb
| colspan="3" style="text-indent:2em" | 93.99(5) keV
| 194(4) ns
|
|
| 1+
|
|
|-
| style="text-indent:1em" | 116m2Sb
| colspan="3" style="text-indent:2em" | 380(40) keV
| 60.3(6) min
| β+
| 116Sn
| 8−
|
|
|-
| 117Sb
| style="text-align:right" | 51
| style="text-align:right" | 66
| 116.904836(10)
| 2.80(1) h
| β+
| 117Sn
| 5/2+
|
|
|-
| 118Sb
| style="text-align:right" | 51
| style="text-align:right" | 67
| 117.905529(4)
| 3.6(1) min
| β+
| 118Sn
| 1+
|
|
|-
| style="text-indent:1em" | 118m1Sb
| colspan="3" style="text-indent:2em" | 50.814(21) keV
| 20.6(6) µs
|
|
| (3)+
|
|
|-
| style="text-indent:1em" | 118m2Sb
| colspan="3" style="text-indent:2em" | 250(6) keV
| 5.00(2) h
| β+
| 118Sn
| 8−
|
|
|-
| 119Sb
| style="text-align:right" | 51
| style="text-align:right" | 68
| 118.903942(9)
| 38.19(22) h
| EC
| 119Sn
| 5/2+
|
|
|-
| style="text-indent:1em" | 119m1Sb
| colspan="3" style="text-indent:2em" | 2553.6(3) keV
| 130(3) ns
|
|
| (19/2−)
|
|
|-
| style="text-indent:1em" | 119m2Sb
| colspan="3" style="text-indent:2em" | 2852(7) keV
| 850(90) ms
| IT
| 119Sb
| 27/2+#
|
|
|-
| 120Sb
| style="text-align:right" | 51
| style="text-align:right" | 69
| 119.905072(8)
| 15.89(4) min
| β+
| 120Sn
| 1+
|
|
|-
| style="text-indent:1em" | 120m1Sb
| colspan="3" style="text-indent:2em" | 0(100)# keV
| 5.76(2) d
| β+
| 120Sn
| 8−
|
|
|-
| style="text-indent:1em" | 120m2Sb
| colspan="3" style="text-indent:2em" | 78.16(5) keV
| 246(2) ns
|
|
| (3+)
|
|
|-
| style="text-indent:1em" | 120m3Sb
| colspan="3" style="text-indent:2em" | 2328.3(6) keV
| 400(8) ns
|
|
| (6)
|
|
|-
| 121Sb
| style="text-align:right" | 51
| style="text-align:right" | 70
| 120.9038157(24)
| colspan=3 align=center|Stable
| 5/2+
| 0.5721(5)
|
|-
| rowspan=2|122Sb
| rowspan=2 style="text-align:right" | 51
| rowspan=2 style="text-align:right" | 71
| rowspan=2|121.9051737(24)
| rowspan=2|2.7238(2) d
| β− (97.59%)
| 122Te
| rowspan=2|2−
| rowspan=2|
| rowspan=2|
|-
| β+ (2.41%)
| 122Sn
|-
| style="text-indent:1em" | 122m1Sb
| colspan="3" style="text-indent:2em" | 61.4131(5) keV
| 1.86(8) µs
|
|
| 3+
|
|
|-
| style="text-indent:1em" | 122m2Sb
| colspan="3" style="text-indent:2em" | 137.4726(8) keV
| 0.53(3) ms
|
|
| (5)+
|
|
|-
| style="text-indent:1em" | 122m3Sb
| colspan="3" style="text-indent:2em" | 163.5591(17) keV
| 4.191(3) min
| IT
| 122Sb
| (8)−
|
|
|-
| 123Sb
| style="text-align:right" | 51
| style="text-align:right" | 72
| 122.9042140(22)
| colspan=3 align=center|Stable
| 7/2+
| 0.4279(5)
|
|-
| 124Sb
| style="text-align:right" | 51
| style="text-align:right" | 73
| 123.9059357(22)
| 60.20(3) d
| β−
| 124Te
| 3−
|
|
|-
| rowspan=2 style="text-indent:1em" | 124m1Sb
| rowspan=2 colspan="3" style="text-indent:2em" | 10.8627(8) keV
| rowspan=2|93(5) s
| IT (75%)
| 124Sb
| rowspan=2|5+
| rowspan=2|
| rowspan=2|
|-
| β− (25%)
| 124Te
|-
| style="text-indent:1em" | 124m2Sb
| colspan="3" style="text-indent:2em" | 36.8440(14) keV
| 20.2(2) min
|
|
| (8)−
|
|
|-
| style="text-indent:1em" | 124m3Sb
| colspan="3" style="text-indent:2em" | 40.8038(7) keV
| 3.2(3) µs
|
|
| (3+, 4+)
|
|
|-
| 125Sb
| style="text-align:right" | 51
| style="text-align:right" | 74
| 124.9052538(28)
| 2.75856(25) y
| β−
| 125mTe
| 7/2+
|
|
|-
| 126Sb
| style="text-align:right" | 51
| style="text-align:right" | 75
| 125.90725(3)
| 12.35(6) d
| β−
| 126Te
| (8−)
|
|
|-
| rowspan=2 style="text-indent:1em" | 126m1Sb
| rowspan=2 colspan="3" style="text-indent:2em" | 17.7(3) keV
| rowspan=2|19.15(8) min
| β− (86%)
| 126Te
| rowspan=2|(5+)
| rowspan=2|
| rowspan=2|
|-
| IT (14%)
| 126Sb
|-
| style="text-indent:1em" | 126m2Sb
| colspan="3" style="text-indent:2em" | 40.4(3) keV
| ~11 s
| IT
| 126m1Sb
| (3−)
|
|
|-
| style="text-indent:1em" | 126m3Sb
| colspan="3" style="text-indent:2em" | 104.6(3) keV
| 553(5) ns
|
|
| (3+)
|
|
|-
| 127Sb
| style="text-align:right" | 51
| style="text-align:right" | 76
| 126.906924(6)
| 3.85(5) d
| β−
| 127mTe
| 7/2+
|
|
|-
| 128Sb
| style="text-align:right" | 51
| style="text-align:right" | 77
| 127.909169(27)
| 9.01(4) h
| β−
| 128Te
| 8−
|
|
|-
| rowspan=2 style="text-indent:1em" | 128mSb
| rowspan=2 colspan="3" style="text-indent:2em" | 10(7) keV
| rowspan=2|10.4(2) min
| β− (96.4%)
| 128Te
| rowspan=2|5+
| rowspan=2|
| rowspan=2|
|-
| IT (3.6%)
| 128Sb
|-
| 129Sb
| style="text-align:right" | 51
| style="text-align:right" | 78
| 128.909148(23)
| 4.40(1) h
| β−
| 129mTe
| 7/2+
|
|
|-
| rowspan=2 style="text-indent:1em" | 129m1Sb
| rowspan=2 colspan="3" style="text-indent:2em" | 1851.05(10) keV
| rowspan=2|17.7(1) min
| β− (85%)
| 129Te
| rowspan=2|(19/2−)
| rowspan=2|
| rowspan=2|
|-
| IT (15%)
| 129Sb
|-
| style="text-indent:1em" | 129m2Sb
| colspan="3" style="text-indent:2em" | 1860.90(10) keV
| >2 µs
|
|
| (15/2−)
|
|
|-
| style="text-indent:1em" | 129m3Sb
| colspan="3" style="text-indent:2em" | 2138.9(5) keV
| 1.1(1) µs
|
|
| (23/2+)
|
|
|-
| 130Sb
| style="text-align:right" | 51
| style="text-align:right" | 79
| 129.911656(18)
| 39.5(8) min
| β−
| 130Te
| (8−)#
|
|
|-
| style="text-indent:1em" | 130mSb
| colspan="3" style="text-indent:2em" | 4.80(20) keV
| 6.3(2) min
| β−
| 130Te
| (4, 5)+
|
|
|-
| 131Sb
| style="text-align:right" | 51
| style="text-align:right" | 80
| 130.911982(22)
| 23.03(4) min
| β−
| 131mTe
| (7/2+)
|
|
|-
| 132Sb
| style="text-align:right" | 51
| style="text-align:right" | 81
| 131.914467(15)
| 2.79(5) min
| β−
| 132Te
| (4+)
|
|
|-
| style="text-indent:1em" | 132m1Sb
| colspan="3" style="text-indent:2em" | 200(30) keV
| 4.15(5) min
| β−
| 132Te
| (8−)
|
|
|-
| style="text-indent:1em" | 132m2Sb
| colspan="3" style="text-indent:2em" | 254.5(3) keV
| 102(4) ns
|
|
| (6−)
|
|
|-
| 133Sb
| style="text-align:right" | 51
| style="text-align:right" | 82
| 132.915252(27)
| 2.5(1) min
| β−
| 133mTe
| (7/2+)
|
|
|-
| 134Sb
| style="text-align:right" | 51
| style="text-align:right" | 83
| 133.92038(5)
| 0.78(6) s
| β−
| 134Te
| (0-)
|
|
|-
| rowspan=2 style="text-indent:1em" | 134mSb
| rowspan=2 colspan="3" style="text-indent:2em" | 80(110) keV
| rowspan=2|10.07(5) s
| β− (99.9%)
| 134Te
| rowspan=2|(7−)
| rowspan=2|
| rowspan=2|
|-
| β−, n (.091%)
| 133Te
|-
| rowspan=2|135Sb
| rowspan=2 style="text-align:right" | 51
| rowspan=2 style="text-align:right" | 84
| rowspan=2|134.92517(11)
| rowspan=2|1.68(2) s
| β− (82.4%)
| 135Te
| rowspan=2|(7/2+)
| rowspan=2|
| rowspan=2|
|-
| β−, n (17.6%)
| 134Te
|-
| rowspan=2|136Sb
| rowspan=2 style="text-align:right" | 51
| rowspan=2 style="text-align:right" | 85
| rowspan=2|135.93035(32)#
| rowspan=2|0.923(14) s
| β− (83%)
| 136Te
| rowspan=2|1−#
| rowspan=2|
| rowspan=2|
|-
| β−, n (17%)
| 135Te
|-
| style="text-indent:1em" | 136mSb
| colspan="3" style="text-indent:2em" | 173(3) keV
| 570(50) ns
|
|
| 6−#
|
|
|-
| rowspan=2|137Sb
| rowspan=2 style="text-align:right" | 51
| rowspan=2 style="text-align:right" | 86
| rowspan=2|136.93531(43)#
| rowspan=2|450(50) ms
| β−
| 137Te
| rowspan=2|7/2+#
| rowspan=2|
| rowspan=2|
|-
| β−, n
| 136Te
|-
| rowspan=2|138Sb
| rowspan=2 style="text-align:right" | 51
| rowspan=2 style="text-align:right" | 87
| rowspan=2|137.94079(32)#
| rowspan=2|500# ms [>300 ns]
| β−
| 138Te
| rowspan=2|2−#
| rowspan=2|
| rowspan=2|
|-
| β−, n
| 137Te
|-
| 139Sb
| style="text-align:right" | 51
| style="text-align:right" | 88
| 138.94598(54)#
| 300# ms [>300 ns]
| β−
| 139Te
| 7/2+#
|
|

See also

References 

 Isotope masses from:

 Isotopic compositions and standard atomic masses from:

 Half-life, spin, and isomer data selected from the following sources. 

 
Antimony
Antimony